Anthony Rose (born 24 September 1964) is a serial tech entrepreneur whose career has spanned across many sectors including the advent of 3D graphics, P2P music, video streaming, social TV, social platforms, and most recently, legal technology.

Rose is best known for his work managing the launch of BBC iPlayer, for which Wired UK named him "the man who saved the BBC". Anthony lead the team as CTO from 2007 until 2010, taking the BBC iPlayer from pre-launch to success, eventually ending up leading most of the BBC’s online proposition and managing a team of 250 people.

Since leaving the BBC Anthony has founded 5 companies. He sold Beamly to COTY in 2015, and 6Tribes to the TopGear team in 2016, both for an undisclosed amount. He is the co-founder and investor in QJAM, which is due to launch soon and he is co-founder of Hey Blab which is still in development. Anthony is currently working as co-founder and CEO of SeedLegals, the world’s first legal automation platform for startup funding that closed their own $4 million Series A funding round in May 2019 led by Index Ventures. SeedLegals is now the largest closer of funding rounds in the UK, and is forecast to process 20% of all UK funding rounds by the end of 2019.

Early life and education 
Anthony Rose was born on 24 September 1964 in Cape Town, South Africa. At the age of 14 Rose began developing his own 6800-based home computer and within a year, using a robot ‘pick and place’ machine and an automated soldering machine in his study, he was developing various computer products, including a RAM character generator add-on board and a RAM-based hard drive emulator for the Apple II. He then set up a company, A. R. Technology, through which to sell these products.

Whilst at university Rose obtained a license to legally exceed the national speed limit so he could measure velocity and air-flow over his Alfa Romeo in an attempt to reduce air resistance and increase the fuel efficiency of the car.

Career 
Rose started his entrepreneurial journey at a 3D graphics platform that IPO’d in 1994 and eventually merged into the music file sharing company Kazaa. Rose’s plan to launch a legal music download service was met with a multitude of copyright lawsuits in a time when the rise of the internet and online music downloads were causing music sales to decline by £1 billion per year. Kazaa eventually won the legal battle, they were deemed not responsible for the actions of their users, and Rose was allowed to finish the development of their licensed music store.

After Kazaa, Rose travelled from Australia to the UK to head up the BBC iPlayer build. His first achievement was securing the rights to show BBC content in Adobe Flash, the industry standard software for streaming. He then focused on the usability of the platform by refining the interface and increasing the accessibility by getting iPlayer onto Macs, the iPhone, and the Nintendo Wii. Rose ran his team in the BBC like a startup and by monitoring Twitter, chatrooms and online forums he continuously improved the product through customer feedback. Rose was CTO of BBC iPlayer from 2007 until 2010, during which time it received a Bafta Award for Innovation, the team grew from 65 to over 250 people, and it, at max, accounted for 20% of the UK’s total online traffic during the 2008 Beijing Olympics.

In 2011, Rose’s second foray into startup disruption was with a social TV company called Zeebox, which later rebranded as Beamly. Beamly grew to 2 million active users in 2014 before being sold to COTY in 2015 for an undisclosed amount.

Rose then went on to found the social network 6Tribes in 2015, an interest-based social platform where users are able to form chat groups based on shared interests. 6Tribes was acquired by Jeremy Clarkson, James May and Richard Hammond in 2016 and is now used under the DriveTribe brand. Shortly after the sale, DriveTribe went on to receive $6.5 million investment from 21st Century Fox.

In September 2016 Anthony Rose co-founded SeedLegals, alongside co-founders Laurent Laffy (Managing Partner of VC firm Arts Alliance) and Anthony Drogon (former Head of Development at Arkena). SeedLegals is the first legal automation platform that dynamically creates all the legals needed to get funded and grow your business. SeedLegals is now the largest closer of startup funding rounds in the UK and they cut both the time and cost of completing a funding round by 80% when compared to conventional lawyers.

Other ventures that Anthony has been involved in include voice messaging app Hey Blab (founded by Rose in August 2016), leading broadcast graphics provider Vizrt (board Director since March 2015), pre-launch music startup QJAM (investor and co-founder), and student social network Papped (investor).

Rose's holds 14 patents including patents for distributed online rewards, content discovery and interactive television.

Honors and awards
In 2008 the BBC's iPlayer won a Bafta in the category of 'Interactive Innovation - Service / Platform' against strong competition from KateModern, Bebo Open Media Platform, and Channel 4's Big Art Mob. In 2009 Rose won Broadcast Magazine's Individual Achievement Award, in June 2012 he won the ITVT All-star award  for Leadership, and in March 2013 he received the Digital Innovation award from the Digital TV Euro50 Awards for his role as co-founder and CTO at Zeebox.

Patents

References

External links 
 https://seedlegals.com
 http://www.vizrt.com
 https://web.archive.org/web/20170211075320/http://heyblab.com/
 http://www.bbc.co.uk/iplayer
 

Living people
1964 births
University of Cape Town alumni